Union Square may refer to:

Places
Australia
 Union Square, a shopping centre in Brunswick West, Melbourne, Victoria

Canada
 Union Square, Nova Scotia

China
 Tuanjie Square, Hotan, China

Hong Kong
 Union Square (Hong Kong), in Kowloon to the west of Kwun Chung and the northwest of Tsim Sha Tsui

Romania
Piața Unirii, literally Union Square
Piața Unirii metro station, a Bucharest Metro station on Lines M1, M2, and M3

Scotland
 Union Square Aberdeen, a leisure/retail/transport hub in Aberdeen

United Arab Emirates
 Union (Dubai Metro), a Dubai Metro station on the Red and Green Lines

United States
 Union Square, Baltimore, Maryland
 Union Square, Manhattan, New York
 14th Street–Union Square station, a New York City Subway station on the BMT Broadway Line, the BMT Canarsie Line and the IRT Lexington Avenue Line
 Success Academy Union Square, part of Success Academy Charter Schools
 Union Square (Washington, D.C.)
 Union Square, San Francisco, California
 Union Square/Market Street station, a Muni Metro station on the Central Subway that will eventually be on the T Third Street line
 Union Square (Seattle), Washington
 Union Square, Boston, Massachusetts
 Union Square station (Allston), a former Massachusetts Bay Transportation Authority station on the Green Line A branch
 Union Square (Somerville), Massachusetts
 Union Square station (Somerville), a Massachusetts Bay Transportation Authority station on the Green Line D branch
 Union Square (Greensboro), North Carolina

Other
 Union Square (TV series), an NBC comedy series that aired during the 1997–1998 season
 Union Square (film), a 2011 film
 Union Square, a 1988 book by author Meredith Tax
 Union Square, a song by Tom Waits from Rain Dogs